North Carolina's state elections were held on November 8, 2016.

All 120 seats of the North Carolina House of Representatives and all 50 seats of the North Carolina Senate, as well as the offices of Governor, Lieutenant, Attorney General, Treasurer, and Secretary of State were up for election.

Federal Elections

Presidential

Primaries

Democratic PrimaryThe North Carolina Primary for the Democratic Party took place on March 15, 2016. Secretary of State Hillary Clinton beat Senator Bernie Sanders, with 54.50% of the vote to Sanders' 40.86%. Clinton received 60 of the state's delegates, with the remaining 47 going to Sanders. The Democratic Primary took place on the same day as Florida, Illinois, Missouri, and Ohio.

Republican PrimaryThe North Carolina Primary for the Republican Party took place on March 15, 2016. 12 Republican Candidates appeared on the ballot, of which only four; Donald Trump, Ted Cruz, John Kasich, and Marco Rubio, were still in the race. Donald Trump won the primary with 40.23% of the vote, followed by Cruz's 36.76%, Kasich's 12.67%, and Rubio's 7.73%. One withdrawn candidate, Ben Carson, received a single delegate. Trump's victory was closer than expected, as he and Cruz performed well in different metropolitan areas.

General Election
Donald Trump won the state with 49.83% of the vote, with a margin of 3.66% over Hillary Clinton. Many of the predictions for North Carolina labeled it as either a tossup or leaning towards Clinton. There was an increase in turnout from 2012 for both the Democrats and Republicans.

Senate
Incumbent Senator Richard Burr beat his Democratic challenger, Deborah K. Ross, with 51.1% of the vote. However, on Election Night, the polls were showing very well for Ross.

House of Representatives

State

Council of State

Governor

Lieutenant Governor

Attorney General

General Assembly

Summary
Senate

House of Representatives

Senate

House of Representatives

Source: North Carolina State Board of Elections, Ballotpedia

Judiciary

References

 
North Carolina